The Council of Portugal, officially, the Royal and Supreme Council of Portugal (Portuguese: Real e Supremo Conselho de Portugal; Spanish: Real y Supremo Consejo de Portugal), was the ruling body and a key part of the government of the Kingdom of Portugal during the Iberian Union. The council was founded in 1582 by Philip I of Portugal following the model of the Council of Castile. It provided Portugal with a large degree of autonomy from the Portuguese House of Habsburg.

Apart from administering the Kingdom of Portugal and the Algarves, the council administered Portugal's colonial empire.

The council ceased to exist after the Portuguese Restoration War.

See also
 Iberian Union

References

1582 establishments in Europe
Iberian Union
16th-century establishments in Portugal